"Life on Your Own" is a song by the British synthpop group The Human League. Written jointly by lead singer Philip Oakey, Keyboard players Jo Callis and Adrian Wright, it was recorded at AIR Studios between 1983–1984. Originally an album track on Hysteria, it was then released as a single in the UK.

Background 
The song was conceived, written and recorded at a time when the band were under considerable pressure to provide Virgin Records with a follow up album to equal the enormous international success of Dare. The band had taken up residence in the £1,000 a day Air Studios; they were there a full year and were agonising (and arguing) over every note of every track. Dare producer Martin Rushent had already quit because of the rows and indecision causing further delays.  Nick Heyward of Haircut One Hundred famously mocked the Human League in the media for taking the same time to program one drum machine as it took him to record his entire album at Air. The drum machine in question was the LinnDrum and it was being programmed for the track "Life on Your Own", a task that took two months.

"Life on Your Own" is heavily drum machine and synthesizer led and is a return to the sound of the Human League pre-"Don't You Want Me" era. The overall sound is intentionally slow, downbeat and deliberately melancholy.  It was released as a single in June 1984,  and became  a hit by getting into the  UK top 20, reaching number 16. The lyrics were deemed "depressing" and starting with the line "Winter is approaching, there is snow upon the ground", it did not sit well with the 'happy' summer holiday records it was on sale next to. Despite this, the tune of the song is fairly upbeat in contrast to the melancholy of the lyrics. It remained in the UK charts for a further six weeks. Critically it was better appreciated and NME said "Life on Your Own" was one of Hysteria'''s best moments"

It is acknowledged since, that in rushing the single out mid-summer to capitalise on Hysteria's success in the album charts was a mistake, and waiting until Christmas 1984 would have made more commercial sense for this track.

Promotional video

The music video for the song was filmed in London, UK in April 1984. After the 'Faux concert' scenario of "The Lebanon", The Human League returned to a themed story telling promotional video. Inspired by 1971 film The Omega Man'', the video features a lonely, survivalist Oakey in the role of 'the last man on Earth', roaming deserted London landmarks haunted by the ghosts of the band's female singers Susan Ann Sulley and Joanne Catherall. Some sections of the video were shot inside the empty White City Stadium just a few months before its demolition in 1985.

Track listing
 7" vinyl (Virgin VS688)
 "Life on Your Own" – 4:10
 "The World Tonight" – 4:09

 12" vinyl (Virgin VS688-12)
 "Life on Your Own" – 4:10
 "The World Tonight" – 4:09
 "Life on Your Own (Extended)" – 5:43

References 

The Human League songs
1984 singles
Song recordings produced by Chris Thomas (record producer)
Song recordings produced by Hugh Padgham
Songs about loneliness
Songs written by Jo Callis
Songs written by Philip Oakey
Songs written by Philip Adrian Wright
1984 songs
Virgin Records singles